Telekom Tower, also known as TM Tower is a 55-story, 310-meter-tall supertall skyscraper in Kuala Lumpur, Malaysia.
It is the world's 4th tallest twisted building. It is Malaysia's 5th tallest building, and is shaped to represent a sprouting "bamboo shoot". It is regarded as the first twisted skyscraper in the world. It was designed by Hijjas Kasturi Associates and was constructed between 1998 and 2001 by Daewoo Construction. The building was officially opened on 11 February 2003 by the fourth Malaysian Prime Minister, Tun Dr. Mahathir Mohamad.
It resembles the Bitexco Financial Tower of Ho Chi Minh City (finished in 2010) and the Telecommunications Tower  (finished in 2002) in Montevideo.

With a series of hanging gardens climbing it, the structure cost over $160 million. The tower has been designed to benefit from its surrounding environment, using its windows, orientation, and air condition system to encourage energy saving.

The complex also includes a theatre able to seat a 2,500 audience, a large prayer hall (surau), and a sports facility. A unique feature of the tower is its 22 open sky gardens alternating every three floors. The office floors are separated into north and south wings served by express double-deck elevators.

Near the building is Kerinchi Pylon, the tallest electricity pylon in Southeast Asia.

Construction

Tenants
Menara Telekom houses several well-known tenants, namely Mercedes-Benz, BASF, DHL, Hapag-Lloyd, Unilever, Henkel Malaysia, Malaysia Airlines, Takaful Nasional and the IT Department of Tenaga Nasional.

Avengers promotion
The building resembles Stark Tower (later Avengers Tower) as depicted in the Marvel Cinematic Universe films, starting with The Avengers. As part of the collaboration between TM and Marvel Malaysia in a tie-in for Avengers: Infinity War, the Avengers logo was projected on the Telekom Tower.

See also

 Bitexco Financial Tower
 List of skyscrapers
 List of tallest buildings in Malaysia

References

External links
 Telekom Malaysia
 Menara Telekom on CTBUH Skyscraper Center
 Hijjas Kasturi Associates

 Office buildings completed in 2001
2001 establishments in Malaysia
 Postmodern architecture in Malaysia
 Skyscraper office buildings in Kuala Lumpur